The British Rail Class 92 is a dual-voltage electric locomotive, which can run on 25 kV AC from overhead wires or 750 V DC from a third rail. It was designed specifically to operate services through the Channel Tunnel between Great Britain and France. Eurotunnel indicates the Class 92 locomotive as the reference for other locomotives which railway undertakings might want to get certified for usage in the Channel tunnel.

Locomotives of this type are operated by GB Railfreight/Europorte 2 and DB Cargo UK. In France, a number were also owned and operated by SNCF; these were classified as CC 92000 on French railways.

The Class 92 was intended as a mixed-traffic locomotive both for hauling international freight trains and the ill-fated, never introduced Nightstar passenger sleeper trains though the Channel Tunnel. Since introduction, the fleet was exclusively allocated to freight; however, in March 2015, six locomotives owned by GB Railfreight have begun passenger operations hauling the Caledonian Sleeper on behalf of Serco between London and Scotland, marking the first use of the class in commercial passenger service.

Design
The fleet of 46 locomotives was built by a consortium of Brush Traction and ABB Traction. Parts construction was sub-contracted, with final construction and commissioning being undertaken at Brush's erecting shops at Loughborough between 1993 and 1996. The first unit was produced from 1992 and finished in April 1993.

The bodyshells, of a similar design to Brush's Class 60 diesel locomotives but with a modified front end, were fabricated by Procor Engineering of Horbury and delivered pre-painted in the then-standard Railfreight triple-grey livery. The traction system was provided by ABB and comprises GTO thyristor traction converters and ABB's then-new microprocessor-based MICAS-S2 modular electronic control system.

The locomotive is fitted with both rheostatic and regenerative braking, in addition to standard Westinghouse air brake equipment. An electrical train bus is fitted to enable two locomotives to work in multiple formation, either double-heading or push-pull train with a Driving Van Trailer or DBSO.

To reduce the possibility of locomotive failure in the Channel Tunnel, most of the electrical systems are duplicated.

Operations

Prior to introduction to service, two locomotives (92001 and 92002) were extensively tested at the Czech Railway's test track at Velim near Kolín. One locomotive was temporarily moved from here to Vienna Arsenal for climatic testing.

The majority of the class are named after European composers and writers.

Prior to the privatisation of British Rail, ownership of the class was split between Railfreight Distribution, European Passenger Services (later Eurostar UK) and SNCF. After privatisation the ownership of the Railfreight Distribution fleet was passed to the English, Welsh & Scottish Railway (EWS, later DB Schenker/DB Cargo UK).

During 2000, Eurostar (UK) offered their seven members of the class (92020, 92021, 92032, 92040, and 92044–92046) for sale, as they were surplus to requirements following the cancellation of Nightstar services. However, no buyer could be found so they were decommissioned and stored at Crewe International electric depot. Five of these locomotives have now been purchased by Eurotunnel to be used by their Europorte 2 rail freight undertaking for short haul rail traffic in France. In July 2011, Europorte 2/Eurotunnel purchased the five remaining locomotives that had belonged to SNCF, bringing Eurotunnel's total up to 16 Class 92s.

In 2009, an upgrade project was undertaken to allow the class to operate on High Speed 1; chiefly by installing TVM signalling. The project received funding from the European Commission and it was anticipated services would begin in early 2010. On 25 March 2011, a Class 92 locomotive ran from Dollands Moor to Singlewell using the TVM-430 signalling system for the first time. A loaded container train ran for the first time on 27 May 2011 and further trials with loaded wagons were planned until the end of June 2011. In July 2011, a trial run of wagons carrying curtain-walled swap bodies built to a larger European loading gauge was run from Dollands Moor to east London. From 11 November 2011, a weekly service using European-size swap bodies has run between Barking, London, and Poland using High Speed 1.

In April 2015, GB Railfreight commenced a contract to haul the Caledonian Sleeper. Class 92s haul it from London Euston to Edinburgh Waverley/Glasgow Central. On 31 March 2015, the first Serco Caledonian Sleeper hauled by 92018 left London Euston for Scotland.

On 18 January 2017, the specially-branded locomotive 92015 hauled the first train of twenty flatcars loaded with  intermodal containers to Ripple Lane, near Barking; thus completing the first direct rail freight service between China and the UK. The train left Yiwu station in eastern China's Zhejiang province on 1 January and covered .

Liveries

All units were originally painted in a simplified version of the sub-sector railfreight livery of two-tone grey livery, but with a dark blue roof; the same shade as used on Eurostar trains.

To reflect their Channel Tunnel role, all were fitted with three 'O' shaped tunnel logos, each smaller than the next.
Names were mainly blue stickers, but a limited number of locomotives gained cast nameplates.
Only 92031 did not receive a name during construction, however, it did gain one under EWS ownership.

The locomotives were fitted with Crewe Electric depot plaques to reflect their maintenance facility and to reflect ownership; the nine SNCF owned machines had SNCF branding, six Eurostar owned locos had EPS (European Passengers Services) branding, with the rest having standard cast BR arrows under the drivers window reflecting British Rail ownership.

A number of Railfreight Distribution locomotives had "Railfreight Distribution" written along the locomotive side panels with a small RfD logo included.

Following the privatisation of British Rail and the EWS purchase of Railfreight Distribution, the intention was to paint the RfD Class 92s into the EWS gold and dark red colours. In the end, only two locomotives received EWS livery (92001 and 92031). Locomotive no. 92001 had an additional three flags (English, Welsh and Scottish) below the EWS logo on the cabsides, the only one so treated. The rest of the locomotives had a large EWS Logo applied halfway along the side.

Six Class 92s allocated to Eurostar retained their two-tone grey livery, although there had been a plan to repaint these locomotives into Nightstar two-tone green livery.  The combination of rail privatisation, technical problems and the growth of "point to point" low cost airlines undermined the Nightstar venture; the project was abandoned before a single revenue-earning service had even begun. The locomotives remained in two-tone grey until they were purchased by Europorte 2 in the 2000s. Europorte applied the designation "Europorte 2" inside a large Eurotunnel-style circle.

Following the takeover of EWS by DB Schenker, most of the fleet of Class 92s will likely move to DB Schenker Red liveries, matching that on previously repainted Class 66s. 92009 was the first locomotive to be outshopped in the new DB Schenker Red livery. The name "Elgar" had been removed and the locomotive was subsequently renamed "Marco Polo" later during August 2011. The new livery has been completed on five locomotives (92009, 92015, 92016, 92031 and 92042).

In 2009, locomotive 92017 (formerly Shakespeare) was painted into Stobart Rail's blue and white livery and named Bart the Engine.

On 10 March 2011, locomotive 92032 appeared in the new Europorte GB Railfreight livery.

In May 2014, Serco won the franchise to operate Caledonian Sleeper services for fifteen years from 2015, with GBRf to provide traction as part of its franchise bid. In February 2015, 92033 was first to be released from Brush Traction after component refresh and subsequent repaint into a "Midnight Teal" livery. 92006/010/014/018/023/038 have also been painted into this livery, bringing the total number of locomotives now in "Midnight Teal" to seven. Three further locomotives (92020/028/043) were repainted into GBRf House livery.

Fleet

Model railways
In 1995, Hornby Railways launched its first version of the BR Class 92 in OO gauge. It has since released a number of models in different livery.

In 2019, Accurascale announced their intention to release a new OO gauge model of the Class 92, with the first examples being available in December 2022.

Gallery

Notes

References

Sources

Further reading

External links

 SEMG page
 Kent Rail

92
Brush Traction locomotives
Co-Co locomotives
Channel Tunnel
25 kV AC locomotives
750 V DC locomotives
Railway locomotives introduced in 1993
SNCF locomotives
Multi-system locomotives
Standard gauge locomotives of Great Britain
Standard gauge electric locomotives of France
Co′Co′ electric locomotives of Europe